John P. Picollo (born December 10, 1970) is an American baseball executive. He is the general manager and executive vice president for the Kansas City Royals of Major League Baseball. Picollo has been employed with the Royals since 2006.

Picollo is from Cherry Hill, New Jersey. He graduated from Cherry Hill High School West in 1989. He enrolled at North Carolina State University, where he played college baseball for the NC State Wolfpack. He transferred to George Mason University to complete his college baseball career with the George Mason Patriots. Though the Cincinnati Reds selected Picollo in two MLB drafts, Picollo did not sign with the Reds. Undrafted after his senior year at George Mason as a result of elbow injuries, Picollo played in five games for the Oneonta Yankees, the Class A Short Season affiliate of the New York Yankees, in 1994.

In 1999, Picollo joined the Atlanta Braves as a scout. When the Royals hired Dayton Moore as their general manager in 2006, Moore's first hire was Picollo, naming him Director of Player Development. The Royals promoted Moore to team president and Picollo to general manager in September 2021. Picollo assumed the role of general manager and president of baseball operations when Moore was fired in September 2022.

References

External links

1970 births
Living people
People from Cherry Hill, New Jersey
Baseball catchers
Oneonta Yankees players
Atlanta Braves scouts
Kansas City Royals executives
Major League Baseball general managers
NC State Wolfpack baseball players
George Mason Patriots baseball players
Cherry Hill High School West alumni